The Skyway was a gondola lift attraction at Disneyland, at the Magic Kingdom, and at Tokyo Disneyland. Since all versions of this attraction took riders back and forth between Fantasyland and Tomorrowland, the route from Tomorrowland was called Skyway to Fantasyland, and the route from Fantasyland was called Skyway to Tomorrowland.

History

Disneyland 
The Skyway at Disneyland opened on June 23, 1956. It was built by Von Roll, Ltd. based in Bern, Switzerland. It was the first Von Roll Type 101 aerial ropeway in the United States. Walt Disney Imagineering bought the ride from Switzerland. It was a 1947 Vonroll sidechair model. In 1959, a major renovation added The Submarine Voyage, the Disneyland Monorail, the Matterhorn (now a Fantasyland Attraction), and the Motor Boat Cruise, but when the Matterhorn was planned, it was designed to be built in the path of the Skyway. The Skyway closed in late 1957, its tallest tower of 60 feet tall was demolished and Matterhorn Bobsleds was built in its spot. The attraction later reopened in 1959 with the expanded Tomorrowland Complex.

During the Fantasyland renovation at Disneyland in the early 1980s, the Skyway made only roundtrips from Tomorrowland.

The Skyway closed on November 9, 1994. The reason for closure was attributed to metal fatigue. Stress cracks had developed inside the Matterhorn tower battery supports, and the only way to do maintenance was to open up the Matterhorn to do work on it. ADA had no bearing on the Skyway's closure as the ride was grandfathered into ANSI code B77.1. The Skyway's operating budget was transferred to Indiana Jones and the Temple of the Forbidden Eye. The holes in the Matterhorn were partially filled in and the Skyway's cable and supports were dismantled within weeks. Despite popular belief, the Skyway was not closed due necessarily to the assessment of risk newly brought on by a park attendee who intentionally jumped out of the passenger cabin of a gondola into a tree below and sued Disney earlier that year.

While the Tomorrowland Skyway station at Disneyland was removed soon after the attraction's closure, the Fantasyland Skyway station remained intact until mid-2016. The sidewalks up to the station were simply chained off from guests, and the chalet remained empty, eventually hidden from view due to overgrown trees. On May 11, 2016, the City of Anaheim approved a permit to the Walt Disney World Company for the "demolition of 5,132 square feet for Skyway Building #7301", signaling the likely demolition of the chalet, as land clearing for construction of Star Wars: Galaxy's Edge had reached the chalet's western side. After 22 years, the abandoned chalet was demolished after park closing on June 11, 2016, nearly 60 years after the attraction's opening day.

Tokyo Disneyland 
In 1998, Tokyo Disneyland closed its Skyway. The Fantasyland station was removed to make room for Pooh's Hunny Hunt, while the Tomorrowland station was remodeled into a candy store.

Magic Kingdom 
At the Magic Kingdom, the Skyway was removed in 1999. During the renovation of Space Mountain, the Tomorrowland station was demolished in the summer of 2009, while the Fantasyland station was used for stroller parking. However, the Fantasyland station was later demolished for a Tangled-themed restroom area in 2012.

After almost twenty years of absence, Disney revived the classic Skyway in a modern-day take at the Walt Disney World Resort. The new 'Disney Skyliner' connects Disney's Art of Animation, Pop Century, and Caribbean Beach resorts, as well as the Disney Riviera Resort, with other locations such as Disney's Hollywood Studios and the International Gateway at Epcot.

Legacy 
A tribute to the Skyway was added to the Matterhorn Bobsleds after an extensive refurbishment in 2015. Several wrecked Skyway buckets and Matterhorn Bobsled vehicles from the park's history appear just past the top of the lift hill, torn to shreds and abandoned by the attraction's Abominable Snowman. These replaced the original flashing crystals.

In 2017, Disney announced the construction of the Disney Skyliner in Walt Disney World's Epcot Resort Area. While the Skyliner and Skyway are both aerial ropeways, the Skyliner gondolas would be larger than the Skyway cars since the Skyliner would act as a commuter transport between the resorts, Epcot, and Disney's Hollywood Studios.

Gallery

See also 
 List of former Disneyland attractions
 List of Magic Kingdom attractions
 List of incidents at Disneyland Resort
 List of incidents at Walt Disney World
 Disney Skyliner

References

External links 
 Yesterland Skyway page
 Article about Magic Kingdom Skyway death
 Disney's Magic Kingdom | Guests with Needs | Plain Text | Walt Disney World Resort

Former Walt Disney Parks and Resorts attractions
Fantasyland
Tomorrowland
Amusement rides manufactured by Von Roll
Disneyland
Magic Kingdom
Tokyo Disneyland
1956 establishments in California
1994 disestablishments in California
1971 establishments in Florida
1999 disestablishments in Florida
1983 establishments in Japan
1998 disestablishments in Japan